Castle Master is a 1990 video game by developer Teque Software Development and published by Incentive Software. It was released for the ZX Spectrum, Commodore 64, Amstrad CPC, Amiga, Atari ST and IBM PC. A compilation was released also in 1990 that contained the original and the sequel, Castle Master II: The Crypt.

Gameplay

Initially the player chooses between playing as the prince or princess. The character not chosen is then taken away by a dragon to Castle Eternity. (The location of keys and some other items differ slightly between the two characters.)

The game requires the player, through a first person view, to explore Castle Eternity. There are riddles on many of the castle walls, which give gameplay hints. There are also keys and pentacles hidden in various locations for the player to collect. Many rooms contain spirits which attack the player and reduce his or her health. The player's health (represented by a barbell where weights indicate the amount) is also the player's strength which is important for some puzzles. The player's only weapon is an unlimited supply of rocks to throw, but a single hit is sufficient to exorcise most of the spirits. The ultimate goal is to kill the boss spirit Magister (who can only be killed when all other spirits in the castle are destroyed) and thereby rescue the character's opposite number.

There are no lives for the player; if health is reduced to nothing the game is restarted from the beginning unless the player loads a saved game.

Development
Castle Master was built on the Freescape engine, which allows solid, fully three-dimensional environments to be produced. The same engine was used for Castle Master's sequel, The Crypt, and other games released by Incentive Software.

The game's backstory was written by Mel Croucher.

Reception
The game was ranked the 39th best game for the Amiga in Issue 0 of Amiga Power (May 1991). The budget re-release was reviewed by Linda Barker in Issue 17 (September 1992) receiving a 70% score.

References

External links
Castle Master at MobyGames
Castle Master + Castle Master II: The Crypt at MobyGames

Castle Master at the Hall of Light
Castle Master II: The Crypt at the Hall of Light

1990 video games
Amiga games
Amstrad CPC games
Atari ST games
Commodore 64 games
DOS games
Fantasy video games
Freescape games
Domark games
Puzzle video games
Single-player video games
Video games featuring female protagonists
Video games set in castles
ZX Spectrum games
Video games developed in the United Kingdom
Incentive Software games